Evenor (Ancient Greek:  Euenor means "joy of men") was the autochthonous father of Cleito by Leucippe.

Mythology 
In the Critias, a work of the Greek philosopher Plato, a man named Evenor is described as the ancestor of the kings who ruled the legendary island of Atlantis. According to the account given by Plato's character Critias, Evenor was among the original inhabitants of Atlantis born from the earth (autochthons). He lived with his wife Leucippe on a low hill in the centre of the island, about fifty stadia from the sea. The couple had one daughter, Cleito. When the maiden reached marriageable age, her parents died, but the god Poseidon slept with her and she became mother of five pairs of twin sons. Her oldest son, Atlas, became the first king of Atlantis, with the other sons as subordinate governors.

Note

Reference 

 Plato, Critias in Plato in Twelve Volumes, Vol. 9 translated by W.R.M. Lamb. Cambridge, Massachusetts, Harvard University Press; London, William Heinemann Ltd. 1925. Online version at the Perseus Digital Library. Greek text available at the same website.

Characters in Greek mythology
Atlanteans
Atlantis